Maybe is an Irish Thoroughbred racehorse. She was undefeated in five races in 2011 including the Group One Moyglare Stud Stakes and was awarded the title of European Champion Two-Year-Old Filly of 2011 at the Cartier Racing Awards. She was the winter favourite for the 2012 1000 Guineas.

Background
Maybe is a bay filly with a white star bred in Ireland by Epona Bloodstock Ltd at the Croome House Stud in County Limerick. She was sired by The Derby winner Galileo out of the Listed race winner Sumora. As a yearling, Maybe was sent to the Deauville Sales where she was bought for €340,000 by the bloodstock agent Dermot "Demi" O'Byrne, acting on behalf of the Coolmore organisation. Like most Coolmore horses she was sent into training with Aidan O'Brien at Ballydoyle. For racing purposes Maybe was registered as being owned by Derrick Smith, Mrs John Magnier and Michael Tabor.

Racing career

2011: two-year-old season
Maybe made her racecourse debut in a maiden race at Naas on 11 May 2011. Starting at odds of 8/1 she led from the start and won by four and a half lengths from Princess Sinead. In June, Maybe was sent to England to contest the Chesham Stakes at Royal Ascot in which she was pitted against colts. Ridden by Ryan Moore, she took the lead two furlongs from the finish and recorded an "impressive" two and a quarter length victory over Fort Bastion. In the Group Three Silver Flash Stakes at Leopardstown in July, Maybe started the 2/7 favourite and won by a neck from La Collina. In this race she was ridden by her trainer's son Joseph O'Brien. On 7 August, Maybe was moved up to Group Two class for the Debutante Stakes at The Curragh. Ridden again by Joseph O'Brien, Maybe took the lead two furlongs from the finish and won "comfortably" from Yellow Rosebud and Lightening Pearl. Three weeks later, Maybe returned to the Curragh for the Group One Moyglare Stud Stakes. Starting the 8/13 favourite she took the lead two furlongs out and won from Fire Lily and La Collina. In late September, Maybe's form was boosted when Lightening Pearl won the Group One Cheveley Park Stakes at Newmarket.

In November, Maybe was named European Champion Two-Year-Old Filly at the Cartier Racing Awards.

2012: three-year-old season
Maybe made her three-year-old debut in the 1000 Guineas at Newmarket on 6 May for which she was made 13/8 favourite. The start of the race was delayed after the filly Gray Pearl collapsed in the starting stalls. Maybe finished third to her stable companion Homecoming Queen. In The Oaks a month later, Maybe started as 100/30 second favourite, but was again beaten by a stable companion, finishing fifth to Was. The filly was expected to run in the Pretty Polly Stakes on 1 July, but was withdrawn (along with Was) because of the extremely soft ground. Maybe's next appearance was the Falmouth Stakes at Newmarket on 13 July. Racing against older fillies and mares for the first time she finished fifth of the ten runners behind the French-trained four-year-old Giofra. On her only subsequent appearance Maybe finished last of the eight runners in the Matron Stakes at Leopardstown in September.

Breeding record
After the end of her second season Maybe was retired from racing to become a broodmare for the Coolmore Stud. Her second foal Saxon Warrior (by Deep Impact) won the Racing Post Trophy in 2017 and 2000 Guineas in 2018.

Pedigree

 Maybe is inbred 3 × 4 to the stallion Northern Dancer, meaning that Northern Dancer appears once in the third generation and once in the fourth generation of his pedigree.

References

2009 racehorse births
Racehorses bred in Ireland
Cartier Award winners
Racehorses trained in Ireland
Thoroughbred family 1-t